Chocolate Supa Highway is the second studio album by Spearhead.

Track listing 
 "Africa On Line" (0:44)
 "Chocolate Supa Highway" (5:08)
 "Keep Me Lifted" (4:20)
 "Food for tha Masses" (5:01)
 "U Can't Sing R Song" (5:27)
 "Tha Payroll (Stay Strong)" (5:09)
 "Madness in tha Hood (Free Ride)" (4:49)
 "Rebel Music (3 O'Clock Roadblock)" (5:26)
 "Why Oh Why" (4:51)
 "Comin' to Gitcha" (4:07)
 "Life Sentence" (0:13)
 "Ganja Babe" (3:33)
 "Wayfarin' Stranger" featuring Joan Osborne (5:28)
 "Gas Gauge (Tha World's in Your Hands)" (4:35)
 "Water Pistol Man (Chocolate Mix)" (5:44)

Singles 
 "U Can't Sing R Song"
 "Why Oh Why"
 "Keep Me Lifted"

Personnel 
 Michael Franti: vocalist, producer
 Trinna Simmons: vocalist
 Carl Young: bass/sax
 David James: guitar
 Kim Buie: executive producer
 Prince Charles Alexander: mixed and mastered, with the exception of "Rebel Music"
 Joe Nicolo: mixed and mastered "Rebel Music"
 Stephen Marley: co-producer on "Rebel Music"

Other artists
In addition to co-producing the song, Stephen Marley is a guest performer on "Rebel Music (3 O'Clock Roadblock)"
Zap Mama is a guest performer on "Comin' to Gitcha"
Joan Osborne is a guest performer on "Wayfaring Stranger"

Charts

References

Michael Franti albums
1997 albums
Capitol Records albums